Uwais Qorny, known professionally as Iko Uwais, is an Indonesian actor, stuntman, fight choreographer, and martial artist. He is best known for acting in the action films Merantau (2009), The Raid (2011), The Raid 2 (2014), Headshot (2016), Mile 22 (2018), The Night Comes for Us (2018), Stuber (2019) and the Netflix series Wu Assassins (2019–present).

Early life 
Uwais was born in Jakarta, the son of Maisyaroh and Mustapha Kamaluddin. His grandfather, H. Achmad Bunawar, was a silat master and founded a silat school. He is named after the 7th-century Islamic Sufi mystic Owais al-Qarani.

Career 
In 2007, Uwais was discovered by director Gareth Evans, who was filming a documentary about silat a form of martial arts in Uwais's training hall. Uwais's natural charisma and great camera presence encouraged Evans to cast him as the leading role for his first martial art movie, Merantau. After signing a five-year contract with Gareth Evans and his production company, Uwais resigned from his daytime job as an operational driver at Esia, an Indonesian telecom company.

In his first acting experience in Merantau, Uwais played the role of a young Minang (West-Sumatran), which led him to learn the Minang style of silat harimau (tiger style) from Master Edwel Datuk Rajo Gampo Alam. Merantau was released in Indonesia on 6 August 2009. The film was featured in Puchon International Fantastic Film Festival in South Korea and Fantastic Fest in Austin, Texas with highly positive reviews. Merantau won the Best Film award at ActionFest 2010.

Uwais's second collaboration with Gareth Evans was The Raid (known as The Raid: Redemption in the United States), which began filming in mid-March 2011 and was released in mid-2012. The movie has been hailed by critics and audiences in various festivals as one of the best martial art movies in years.

Uwais collaborated on a third movie with Evans, The Raid 2. Uwais also appeared briefly in Star Wars: The Force Awakens (2015), alongside The Raid 2 co-star Yayan Ruhian.

In 2016, he appeared in the martial arts film Headshot, which received generally positive reviews.

In 2017, he filmed the international martial arts film Triple Threat, together with Tony Jaa, Michael Jai White, Tiger Chen, and Scott Adkins—the film was released in early 2019. In 2018, Uwais starred in the films, Mile 22 and The Night Comes for Us.  In the same year, it was announced that Uwais was cast in the lead role of Kai Jin on the Netflix series, Wu Assassins. The series premiered on 8 August 2019. Uwais reprised his role in the sequel film, Fistful of Vengeance. It was released on 17 February 2022 to mixed reviews.

In 2019, Uwais starred in the action comedy film Stuber alongside Kumail Nanjiani and Dave Bautista. In the same year, it was announced that Uwais will appear in a film called China Town Express playing a man who must fight through the gangland of New York to save his family after the disappearance of his son during a gang's killing spree. Uwais is also attached to star in The Bellhop, one of the first five films in development by Balboa Productions, the new production company co-founded by Sylvester Stallone in 2018.

Uwais played Hard Master in Snake Eyes, a spin-off from the G.I. Joe movie franchise. The film was released on 23 July 2021. He will next star in the action thriller, Chinatown Express.

In October 2021, Uwais joined the cast of The Expendables 4, set to be released in 2023.

Personal life 
On 25 June 2012, Uwais married singer Audy Item at the Hotel Gran Mahakam in Jakarta. The couple have two daughters, Atreya Syahla Putri Uwais and Aneska Layla Putri Uwais.

Filmography

Film

Television series

Awards and nominations

See also 
 Cinema of Indonesia
 Martial arts film

References

External links 

 
 
 
 

Articles
 Hollywood Elsewhere: Merantau – Indonesia – Directed by Gareth Evans
 Twitch.com: Merantau Review
 Pifan.com: A Sumatran Tiger Flashes His Claws: Merantau

1983 births
21st-century Indonesian male actors
Action choreographers
Betawi people
Indonesian expatriates in the United States
Indonesian male film actors
Indonesian male television actors
Indonesian martial artists
Indonesian Muslims
Indonesian stunt performers
Living people
Male actors from Jakarta
Silat practitioners